George Norris may refer to:
George A. Norris (1928–2013), Canadian sculptor
George W. Norris (1861–1944), American politician